Folks! is a 1992 American comedy-drama film directed by Ted Kotcheff, written by Robert Klane and starring Tom Selleck as a selfish yuppie who takes in his parents after their house burns down. It was panned by critics, earning Selleck a Razzie nomination for Worst Actor, and also underperformed at the box office.

Plot
Successful stockbroker Jon Aldrich is living a good life with a wife named Audrey and two kids until he encounters his elderly father, Harry, who suffers from dementia, and has accidentally burned down his own house. Jon tries to get his sister, Arlene (who has two sons of her own but is an irresponsible gold digger), to take care of Harry and his wife, Mildred, but she won't even open the door. Consequently, Harry and Mildred, have to move in with him and his family, causing his life to start going downhill.

The company Jon works for was apparently doing illegal things which he knew nothing of, but no one believes him therefore he loses his job. The problems for him continue to mount as Harry continues to cause much trouble and, because of it, his family becomes broke. Audrey moves out with the kids, and they lose everything except their apartment. Furthermore, as a result of his severe senility, Harry continues to unintentionally injure Jon, causing him to get hearing loss, a broken hand, and a broken foot when a car runs over it. He also loses a testicle. Plus, Harry endangers the lives of Jon's kids and himself at one point by jaywalking in an intersection one morning while trying to take them for a walk with him without letting anyone know.

Because of the whole mess, Jon slowly starts to lose his own sanity, but in a brief moment of regaining his own Harry tells him that he never wanted to be a burden on him but he soon slips back into his state of dementia, where he is just consistently happy and often yells out "McDonald's". Jon talks with Mildred who also says that she and Harry never wanted to burden him. She then tells him that they have discussed it, and they want him to help them die so he can collect the insurance money. He initially opposes this but eventually changes his tune.

Somehow ending up agreeing to volunteer to it, Jon helps Harry and Mildred try to commit suicide many unsuccessful times and halfway through the attempts Arlene shows up on his doorstep with both of her corpulent sons, needing a place to live. He initially refuses because she would not even open the door for Harry and Mildred but he eventually caves in and lets them stay. She also joins in on the attempts to help Harry and Mildred die, hoping for a cut of the insurance money. Her attempts are also unsuccessful.

Things slowly start looking up for Jon as Audrey eventually shows up to tell him that she was wrong for leaving and how much she loves the fact that he was willing to take in both Harry and Mildred. Upon her arrival she realizes all the injuries he has suffered since she saw him last, including the missing testicle. As they are reconciling he realizes that Arlene, Harry, and Mildred are gone and he knows they are going to try to commit suicide again with her help, so he tracks them down in an attempt to stop them which he successfully does, but not without facing a bit more injury.

Jon eventually gets their lives on track. He and Audrey buy a house and Harry and Mildred move in with them. Arlene is now with a man who knows how to handle her misbehaving sons. Finally, it is revealed that Harry hasn't been yelling "McDonald's" because he was hungry, but because he bought stock in McDonnell Douglas many years ago, meaning he is worth tons of money.

Cast
 Tom Selleck as Jon Aldrich
 Don Ameche as Harry Aldrich
 Anne Jackson as Mildred Aldrich
 Christine Ebersole as Arlene Aldrich
 Wendy Crewson as Audrey Aldrich
 Michael Murphy as FBI Agent Ed
 Robert Pastorelli as Fred, The Doorman
 Jon Favreau as Chicago Taxi Driver

Production 
Filming was done at the Williams Island.

Reception
On review aggregator website Rotten Tomatoes, the film has a 0% approval rating based on 20 reviews, with an average rating of 2.8/10. The website's critics consensus reads: "Don't watch this alleged comedy looking for more than pained performances in support of ill-advised ageist jokes, because that's all Folks! has to offer." Audiences surveyed by CinemaScore gave the film a grade of "C+" on scale of A+ to F.

Noted the Los Angeles Times, "If gays and lesbians think they're getting a bad rap in the movies, consider the filmic lot of the elderly. First Stop! Or My Mom Will Shoot, now Folks!. Where are the Gray Panthers when you need them?" The New York Times noted that its screenwriter "is best known as the screenwriter of Where's Poppa? and he may be aspiring to comparably dark humor. But "Folks" tries to be tender and vicious simultaneously, and that makes for an impossible mix. A more mean-spiritedly funny actor might have carried this material better, but Mr. Selleck strives for the cuddly rather than the caustic. Mr. Ameche, mugging furiously, affects a jaw-jutting blank look and even props his chin on Mr. Selleck's shoulder occasionally for quasi-comic effect." The film was not a box office success.

References

External links
 
 

1992 films
1992 comedy-drama films
American comedy-drama films
20th Century Fox films
Films directed by Ted Kotcheff
Films produced by Steve Golin
Films shot in Florida
Films scored by Michel Colombier
1990s English-language films
1990s American films